Anonychomyrma tigris is a species of ant in the genus Anonychomyrma. Described by Stitz in 1912, the species is endemic to New Guinea.

References

Anonychomyrma
Insects of New Guinea
Insects described in 1912
Endemic fauna of New Guinea